Morning Star Lake is a lake in the central part of the U.S. state of Nebraska.  Off the Platte River just outside Clarks, the lake is part of a complex of five private, manmade lakes called "Summerwood". The lakes were built as a result of the sand and gravel mining efforts of Overland Sand and Gravel. The lakes are spring fed, sand bottom lakes with clear, clean water. Summerwood is a gated community and Morning Star Lake has approximately 40 houses on it.

The lake's Fourth of July celebration includes a boat parade, sand volleyball, a scavenger hunt, sand castle contests and a community cookout, ending with a fireworks display.

See also
 Geography of Nebraska

Reservoirs in Nebraska
Bodies of water of Merrick County, Nebraska